Dharmavarapu Kottam Aruna (born 4 May 1960) is an Indian politician from Telangana state. She served as a minister in Andhra Pradesh for Information and Public Relations in YS Rajasekhar Reddy's cabinet (2004–2009) and for Small Scale industries, Sugar, Khadi and Village Industries in Rosaiah's cabinet (2009–2010). She represented Gadwal constituency as an MLA in Andhra Pradesh Legislative Assembly between 2004–2014 and in Telangana Legislative Assembly between 2014 and 2018.

Aruna won the 2004 election under Samajwadi Party but later joined the Indian National Congress. She joined Bharatiya Janata Party in 2019 and is appointed as its National Vice President in September 2020.

Early life 
DK Aruna was born on 4 May 1960 to Ch. Narsi Reddy. She is married to D.K. Bharathsimha Reddy and has three children.

Aruna studied science up to Intermediate. She married into a family of politicians and Congress members aged 16.

Her father-in-law, D.K. Satya Reddy, her husband D.K. Bharatha Simha Reddy, and her brother-in-law D.K. Samara Simha Reddy have all been involved in politics. Her father Chitlem Narsi Reddy, brothers Chitlem Venkateswar Reddy and Chitlem Ram Mohan Reddy are congress workers and legislators.

Her father and brother, Venkateswar were assassinated by Maoists on Independence Day in 2005 while attending the celebrations at Narayanpet.

Her entry into public life happened after becoming involved with "grievance redressal" sessions held at the house of her husband's family.

Political career 

Losing her first few elections by narrow margins, she was MLA from Gadwal constituency of Mahaboobnagar district for the first time in 2004.

In 2004, D.K. Aruna won representing the Samajwadi Party and subsequently represented Congress in the 2009 elections.  
While in the opposition, she participated in the historic Electricity agitation, led a Padayatra from Gadwal to the State capital to highlight the irrigation water problems of the farmers in Mahaboobnagar District and went on an indefinite hunger strike for irrigation water to the dry lands of Telangana.

She has also gone on Padayatra from Jamulamma temple in Gadwal mandal to Jogulamba temple in Alampur and later a two-day hunger strike to protest against the State government's refusal to form Gadwal as part of a new district in September 2016 

In 2018, Aruna lost 2018 Telangana Legislative Assembly election from Gadwal to her nephew Bandla Krishna Mohan Reddy of Telangana Rashtra Samithi.

In March 2019, she joined the Bharatiya Janata Party and she contested 2019 Lok sabha elections from Mahabubnagar constituency where she lost by 77,829 votes.

In September 2020, She was appointed as Vice President of Bharatiya Janata Party .

Political statistics

References

Women in Telangana politics
Bharatiya Janata Party politicians from Telangana
People from Mahbubnagar district
Members of the Andhra Pradesh Legislative Assembly
Telangana MLAs 2014–2018
Living people
21st-century Indian women politicians
21st-century Indian politicians
State cabinet ministers of Andhra Pradesh
1960 births